Enver Cenk Şahin (born 22 September 1994) is a Turkish professional footballer who plays as a midfielder for Bursaspor.

Club career
On 26 July 2016, Şahin joined FC St. Pauli for one year with an option to sign permanently. In May 2017, the club announced they had exercised the option to sign him permanently with Şahin agreeing to a contract until 2021. The transfer fee paid to İstanbul Başakşehir was reported as €2 million.

He was released by St Pauli in October 2019 after posting comments supporting Turkish soldiers in Syria.

International career
Şahin represented Turkey at the 2013 FIFA U-20 World Cup.

Career statistics

Controversy
In October 2019 Şahin stated open support for the Turkish operation in Northern Syria: "We stand on the side of our heroic military and the armies. Our prayers are with you!" This caused negative reactions among the fans of St. Pauli. Following the uproar, the club took the decision to release the player from the club even though his wages would be paid.

References

External links
 
 
 
 

1994 births
Living people
Sportspeople from Zonguldak
Turkish footballers
Association football midfielders
Turkey youth international footballers
Turkey under-21 international footballers
Süper Lig players
TFF First League players
TFF Second League players
2. Bundesliga players
İstanbul Başakşehir F.K. players
FC St. Pauli players
FC Ingolstadt 04 players
Gaziantep F.K. footballers
Bursaspor footballers
Turkish expatriate footballers
Turkish expatriate sportspeople in Germany
Expatriate footballers in Germany